Grand Prix de la ville de Tunis is a one-day professional road bicycle racing event and sports festival established in 2007 and projected to be held annually each April in Tunis, the capital city of the Tunisian Republic.  GP de la ville de Tunis is part of the UCI Africa Tour.

Past winners 

UCI Africa Tour races
Sport in Tunis
Cycle races in Tunisia
Recurring sporting events established in 2007
2007 establishments in Tunisia
Defunct cycling races in Tunisia
Recurring sporting events disestablished in 2008
2008 disestablishments in Tunisia